The Nelson Mandela 90th Birthday Tribute was held in Hyde Park, London on 27 June 2008 to commemorate Nelson Mandela's ninetieth birthday (18 July). The concert formed part of the 46664 concert series to promote awareness of the HIV/AIDS pandemic, and came twenty years after the 1988 Nelson Mandela 70th Birthday Tribute Concert at Wembley, held while Mandela was still in prison.

The three-and-a-half-hour concert was attended by 46,664 people. General admission tickets were available for £65. It was broadcast on the internet and Virgin Radio with highlights on ITV1. The hosts were Will Smith and his wife Jada, and June Sarpong, with other celebrities including Amy Winehouse, Quincy Jones, Peter Gabriel, Stephen Fry, Lewis Hamilton and Geri Halliwell introducing artists.

Mandela came onstage himself during the concert, where he made a short speech – to great applause.

Performers (in order of appearance) 

Jivan Gasparyan
Razorlight
Into the Hoods
Sipho Mabuse
Soweto Gospel Choir
Leona Lewis
Zucchero
Susannah Owiyo and D'Gary
Sugababes
Will Smith
Annie Lennox
Agape choir
Emmanuel Jal
Jamelia
Loyiso
Vusi Mahlasela
Johnny Clegg
Joan Baez
Eddy Grant
Kurt Darren
Simple Minds
Brian May and Andrea Corr
Amy Winehouse
9ice
Bebe Cool
Josh Groban
Amaral
Queen + Paul Rodgers
Jerry Dammers

The concert finished with a rendition of The Special A.K.A. song "Free Nelson Mandela" with Winehouse and Dammers joined on stage by the night's other performers.

External links
BBC News Reporter's Log of the Concert
46664 campaign concert page

Music festivals in London
Tribute, 90th
2008 in London
2008 in music
Tribute concerts in the United Kingdom
June 2008 events in the United Kingdom